"Get on Up" is a song by American R&B group Jodeci recorded for their third album, The Show, the After Party, the Hotel (1995). The song was released as the third and final single for the album in 1996. "Get on Up" contains the sample of the 1981 song from Quincy Jones featuring Toots Thielemans' "Velas". Produced by Mr. Dalvin, it is the only Jodeci single to date that was not produced or written by group leader DeVante Swing.  It was also the last Jodeci single released in 18 years before the group returned in 2014 with the single "Nobody Wins". The group performed the song when they guest starred in a season one episode of the UPN sitcom Moesha.

Critical reception
Larry Flick from Billboard wrote, "The time, the lads kick it lovely on a lively pop/funk throwdown that harks back to the Spinners and the Gap Band with its breezy harmonies and jovial hand claps. It's a perfect addition to the spring season's party soundtrack, so expect instant R&B radio action, followed by equally ardent play on top 40 stations."

Track listings
 CD, promo
"Get on Up" (Radio Edit) - 3:40
"Get on Up" (Dalvin Remix) - 4:17
"Get on Up" (The Instant Flava Mix) - 4:26
"Get on Up" (LP Instrumental) - 4:21

 Vinyl, 12"
"Get on Up" (LP Version) - 3:43
"Get on Up" (Mr. Dalvin's Remix) - 4:17
"Freek'n You" - 5:07(feat. Ghostface Killah and Raekwon)

Personnel
Information taken from the album’s Liner Notes and Discogs.
K-Ci Hailey - Lead and Background vocals
Jojo Hailey - Lead and Background vocals
Mr. Dalvin - Musical arrangement, Background vocals
DeVante Swing - Background vocals
Additional Instruments: Darryl Pearson
Executive Producers: DeVante Swing, Andre Harrell
Remixing: Instant Flava, Mr. Dalvin
Scratches: DJ Double D (The Instant Flava Mix only)

Charts

Weekly charts

Year-end charts

Notes

External links

1996 singles
Jodeci songs
1995 songs
MCA Records singles
Song recordings produced by DeVante Swing
Uptown Records singles
Songs written by K-Ci